In Kerala, the administrative divisions below the district are called taluks. There are 78 taluks with 1670 villages (including group villages).

{
  "type": "ExternalData",
  "service": "geoshape",
  "properties": {
    "stroke": "#ff0000",
    "stroke-width": 1
  },
  "query": "# Taluks in Kerala\nSELECT ?id ?idLabel\n(concat('', ?idLabel, '') as ?title)\nWHERE\n{\n?id wdt:P361 wd:Q7680362. # is a district\n?id wdt:P17 wd:Q668. # in India\nSERVICE wikibase:label { bd:serviceParam wikibase:language 'en'}\n}"}

See also 
 Districts of Kerala

References 

 

 
Kerala